Wait for Love is a 1985 song by Luther Vandross

Wait for Love may also refer to:
 Wait for Love (album), a 2018 album by Pianos Become the Teeth
 "Wait for Love", a single by Lindy Layton 1991
 "Wait for Love", a single by John Dahlbäck 2004